Francisco Haghenbeck (1965 – 4 April 2021) was a Mexican writer and comics screenwriter.

Biography
Francisco Gerardo Haghenbeck Correa was born in 1965, in Mexico City. He studied Architecture at  La Salle University and worked in museums, and later as a creative and producer. His work has been translated into several languages, including Mandarin Chinese.

He died due to COVID-19 in Tehuacán on 4 April 2021, during the COVID-19 pandemic in Mexico.

References

1965 births
2021 deaths
Deaths from the COVID-19 pandemic in Mexico
Mexican writers